
Gmina Dąbrowa Chełmińska is a rural gmina (administrative district) in Bydgoszcz County, Kuyavian-Pomeranian Voivodeship, in north-central Poland.

Villages
Gmina Dąbrowa Chełmińska contains the villages and settlements of Bolumin, Boluminek, Borki, Czarże, Czemlewo, Dąbrowa Chełmińska, Dębowiec, Gzin, Gzin Dolny, Janowo, Mała Kępa, Mozgowina, Nowy Dwór, Ostromecko, Otowice, Pień, Rafa, Reptowo, Słończ, Strzyżawa, Wałdowo Królewskie and Wielka Kępa.

Neighbouring gminas
Gmina Dąbrowa Chełmińska is bordered by the city of Bydgoszcz and by the gminas of Dobrcz, Unisław and Zławieś Wielka.

References
 Polish official population figures 2006

Dabrowa Chelminska
Bydgoszcz County